The BBC Two Personality idents were a set of idents used on BBC Two from 19 November 2001 (the same day when ITV2 also launched a new look) until 18 February 2007. The idents were produced by the Lambie-Nairn branding agency, who had created the previous look. The idents feature an ivory sans serif white '2' in a yellow environment and performing a variety of tasks, and a purple boxed BBC Two logo.

Conception
Throughout the 1990s, the programming of BBC Two was gradually evolving from factual programming to more light-hearted programming. As a result, the channel's identity at the time was starting to appear alienated - some of the longer-running idents like 'Steam', 'Diary', 'Silk' and 'Copper Cut-Out' were retired at the end of 1999 to combat this, with newer, more appropriate idents like 'Catalyst', 'Excalibur', 'Kebab', 'Predator', 'Wave Day', 'Wave Night', and 'Woodpecker' being introduced as a replacement at the start of 2000. However, by 2001, the channel's programming had evolved to a point where it was primarily entertainment-based, and this was seen as completely incompatible with idents that had, at that point, been regularly airing for as long as a decade. It was eventually decided that the channel's identity would need to be changed on a much larger scale in order to fit in with its evolved schedule; one that would equal the popularity of the previous identity, but also to be more light-hearted and appropriate to fit in with the channel's new programming. Martin Lambie-Nairn, the designer of the previous identity, was recalled to create an entirely new identity: the result was that the '2' from before was retained, but it was now anthropomorphised.

It was also decided to alter the "BBC TWO" logo that had been used previously - this was done by putting the logo in a box, with the BBC stacked on top of the TWO. This design would subsequently be replicated by the other BBC channels between 2002 and 2003.

Idents
All of the idents were computer-generated and featured the '2' from before in a yellow environment, performing various anthropomorphic activities. The newly designed box logo for the channel would be located in the bottom right corner of the screen and would always remain there in both the idents and the presentation. 

A notable occlusion of the look was that of the clock. When the channel rebranded, no clock design was made for the look. Idents continued the use of the 'Subtitles' DOG in the top right corner from the last look, but also included the BBC Two website URL as a DOG in the top left corner which was removed in 2004. Unlike the previous branding, neither the URL or the 'Subtitles' DOG would fade in.

Special
BBC Two, for the first time, decided to reuse some of their previous Christmas idents in the years during this era, instead of a new, annual ident. The Christmas idents are as follows:
Christmas 2001 - The 2 holds out his hands, produces a fairy which then zooms up and forms a Christmas tree from her trail.  This ident was reused during December 2015 as part of that year's Christmas presentation, but with the soundtrack replaced with a choir repeatedly chanting the "two" to the melody of Ding Dong Merrily on High. This ident was reused during December 2016.
Christmas 2002 - A 2 moves left in the screen, and as the camera pans round, we see a snow-covered floor. The 2 then makes a snow 2, complete with sticks for arms. This ident was used in conjunction with the Christmas 2001 version. This ident was also used outside of Christmas during spells of snowy weather. This ident was reinstated during December 2015 as part of that year's Christmas presentation, but with the soundtrack replaced with a choir repeatedly singing "two" to the tune of Deck the Halls. This ident was reused during December 2016.
Christmas 2003 - The 2 is trapped in an ice cube that slides around all over the place. This ident was used in conjunction with the Christmas 2001 version and the Christmas 2002 version. This ident was also used outside of Christmas during spells of hot weather.
Christmas 2004 - The idents from Christmas 2001, 2002, and 2003 were reused.
Christmas 2005 - The 2 is formed out of stars with light trails zooming around the screen against a dark yellow/black background. Variations included one of the stars hitting the screen and the trails tying themselves up in knots. No previous idents were used. This was the final Christmas ident produced during this period.
Christmas 2006 - The 2005 Christmas ident was reused.

Near the end of the period, special idents were used to introduce special programmes.
As part of BBC Two's Pedigree Comedy strand, three new idents featuring the fluffy 2 from 1993 interacting with other dogs were used. The fluffy dog also appeared in promotions.
A special ident to introduce The Armstrongs featured a leather style 2 being looked after by the title characters.
A series on homes produced 2s in two very distinct living rooms - one was a stately home with huge amounts of decoration with a decorated porcelain 2 on a pedestal, another a dark blue and green nature inspired room, with the 2 as an outline on the wall.
Another special ident to introduce Kath & Kim featured a yellow fluffy 2 on the brown desk whilst Kath and Kim discusses this thing before the show starts.
For BBC Two's 40th anniversary in 2004, a number of idents were altered so that the logo rotated to display '40 Years'. The Invisible Walls ident was also altered, so that as the 2 passed between the walls, previous BBC Two idents were projected onto the 2 (the Cube, the TWO, etc.).
The 2004 40th Anniversary ident was then remade for use on BBC Two Northern Ireland in 2014 as part of its "Afternoon Classics" block.
In 2003, BBC Two was made channel of the year. In response, a number of the idents were altered so after a few seconds, the BBC Two logo would rotate to display 'Channel of the Year'.
Four Northern Ireland-only idents were created. In one, which debuted in February 2002, the 2 snaps its fingers and creates the Giant's Causeway. The ident was edited before its first transmission due to how the tall height of the columns, the overuse of the "shaky-cam" effect, and the smoke were too evocative of the September 11 terrorist attacks. The original version was broadcast in October 2014, when BBC Northern Ireland celebrated 90 years of coverage with special idents. In another, the 2 forms a camera from its 'beak' and takes a photograph of the large fish sculpture located on the banks of the Lagan at Donegall Quay, Belfast. A similar variant of this ident was produced, showing the 2 taking a picture of the Slemish landscape, but never aired. The last ident features the 2 at a table with an Ulster Fry but rather than eating the dish it eats a shaker.

Another special ident was created in 2002, following the launch of BBC Four. This special variation of Logo involved the 2 rotating the box to display 'BBC Two' as normal, before rotating it again to display the BBC Four black box logo. This was used before the "BBC Four on BBC Two" strand. Two other variants were also produced of the ident. One included the BBC Three logo for their programming displayed on the channel, but this was rarely used because BBC One repeated a lot of BBC Three's programming (the only known time this was used, was to introduce a simulcast of the first two hours of the launch) and the other had the BBC Three/Four logo replaced with the BBC 2W logo, which was shown in Wales only.

Criticisms
The package has been praised for its creativity, but ultimately largely seen as inferior to its predecessors, mainly for a number of issues. The first of this was the fact that there is significantly less choice. At the time of the launch of the last look had 11 launch idents, as compared to four launch idents with the personality 2s. This was especially noticed by the announcers, and the network director apparently complained to anyone who would listen about the lack of choice. In addition to this, the similarities in style between each ident resulted in them becoming monotonous over time.

A common criticism of the look was the lack of an appropriate ident to introduce serious programming or news items. The Invisible Walls and Bounce Sombre idents went some way towards rectifying this, however the bright yellow colour scheme diminished the effect of any serious outlook it was trying to convey.

Another common criticism of BBC Two itself is that, following the launch of BBC Four, BBC Two had been transferring arts and serious programming to the new channel which many viewers were unable to receive. This was rectified in the BBC Four on BBC Two strand, and to mark this distinction, a special ident was made. This problem was eventually solved completely with the advent of digital switchover.

See also

BBC Two "1991–2001" idents
BBC Two "Window on the World" idents
BBC One "Balloon" idents
BBC One "Rhythm & Movement" idents
History of BBC television idents

References

External links
 TVARK BBC Two 2001 idents
 TV Live BBC Two 2001 idents
 TV Room BBC Two 2001 idents

BBC Two
BBC Idents
Television presentation in the United Kingdom